"Black Book" is the nickname frequently used to refer to a list of people who are unwelcome in casinos. The name comes from the fact that the people listed are essentially blacklisted. The term can refer either to such a list officially maintained by a particular gaming control board or to the Griffin Book, whose information is shared among subscribing casinos. According to technologist Jeff Jonas, "Casinos face legal and financial risk if they let the wrong people play. People with gambling addictions can place themselves on exclusionary lists, and can actually sue casinos if they are allowed to place bets."

In the case of gaming control boards, people listed are generally suspected of having, or known to have, ties to organized crime. Casinos are obliged by regulations to exclude all such people from entry and can be subject to sanctions for failure to do so.

In the Griffin Book, published by Griffin Investigations, listed individuals are generally suspected of being, or known to be, either advantage players or outright cheaters at the casino games themselves. Thus, casinos find it in their own economic best interest to exclude such individuals. Those listed may be anyone perceived as a threat to the casino's profits, whether through legal means, such as card counters, or through illegal means, such as people who mark cards or those who try to cheat slot machines. Also included are those considered a threat to the casino, such as players the casinos simply believe are winning either too much or too often, even if their exact methodology is unknown. The book keeps pictures obtained either from a photo of the individual when detained or simply questioned and released, or from surveillance photos. At least one successful defamation lawsuit has been brought as a result of the Griffin Book.

See also
Blacklist (disambiguation)

References

External links
 
 
 

Blacklisting
Casinos
Gambling regulation